Jacques-Maximilien Benjamin Bins, comte de Saint-Victor (1772 - 1858) was a French poet and man of letters.

Personal
Bins de Saint-Victor was born in Fort Dauphin, Saint Domingue (now Fort-Liberté, Haiti) on the island of Hispaniola in 1772. At the time of his birth, Saint Domingue was a French colony. He died in Paris in 1858.

His son, Paul de Saint-Victor, became a well-known essayist and critic.

Career
During the First Empire, Bins de Saint-Victor was arrested as a royalist conspirator and incarcerated at Paris. After the fall of Napoleon, he was one of the editors of the Journal des débats and also worked on the Drapeau blanc. Having tried without success to found a bookstore with Félicité Robert de Lamennais, he spent some time in the United States. On his return he worked at the La France newspaper.

In addition to his poetical works and a verse translation of Anacreon, he published numerous historical studies as well as three opera libretti.

Works

Poems 
Amour et galanterie dans le genre de Faublas, 2 vol., 1801
L'Espérance, poème, 1802
Les Grands Poètes malheureux, 1802
Le Voyage du poète, poème, 1806
Odes d'Anacréon, traduites en vers sur le texte de Brunck, 1810
Ode sur la Révolution française et sur la chute du tyran, 1814
Ode sur la première et la seconde Restauration du trône, 1815
Œuvres poétiques, 1822

Essays and correspondence 
Musée des antiques, dessiné et gravé par Pierre Bouillon, avec des notices explicatives par Jacques Bins de Saint-Victor, 3 vol., 1810-1821
Préface des Soirées de Saint-Pétersbourg de Joseph de Maistre-Edition de 1922.
Tableau historique et pittoresque de Paris depuis les Gaulois jusqu'à nos jours, 3 vol., 1808-1809 ; 2nd édition augmentée, 8 vol., 1822-1827
Quelques observations sur la lettre de Fouché au duc de Wellington, suivies du texte de cette lettre et de quelques notes explicatives, 1817
Atlas du Tableau historique et pittoresque de Paris depuis les Gaulois jusqu'à nos jours, 214 planches, 1827
Documents historiques, critiques, apologétiques concernant la Compagnie de Jésus, 3 vol., 1827-1830
Lettres sur les États-Unis d'Amérique, écrites en 1832 et 1833, et adressées à M. le Cte O'Mahony, 2 vol., 1835
Correspondance littéraire, découverte d'une petite mystification, 1837
De l'Origine et de la nature du pouvoir d'après les monuments historiques, ou Études sur l'histoire universelle, 1840
Les Fleurs des saints. Actes des saints martyrs rédigés et classés d'après l'ordre chronologique, 1845

Opera libretti 
La rivale d'elle-même, opéra-comique in one act, music by Jean-Pierre Solié, premiered at the Salle Favart, 3 October 1800
L'habit du chevalier de Grammont, opéra-comique in one act, music by Eler, premiered at the Théâtre Feydeau, 6 December 1803
Uthal, opera in one act in verse imitated from Ossian, music by Méhul, premiered at the Salle Favart, 17 May 1806

References

External links 
Texts available at Gallica
L'Espérance
Les Grands Poètes malheureux
Tableau historique et pittoresque de Paris depuis les Gaulois jusqu'à nos jours  I-1, I-2, II-1, II-2, III-1, III-2, IV-1, IV-2
Quelques observations sur la lettre de Fouché au duc de Wellington

Texts available online
 
 
Le Voyage du poète
Odes d'Anacréon
Œuvres poétiques
Jacques Bins, comte de Saint-Victor file on Data.bnf.fr

1772 births
1858 deaths
19th-century French poets
19th-century French dramatists and playwrights
19th-century French male writers
French opera librettists
French people of Haitian descent
People of Saint-Domingue
People from Fort-Liberté